Leandro Resida (born 11 October 1989) is a Dutch professional footballer who played as a winger for Rayong in Thai League 1. He formerly played for Telstar and FC Emmen.

Career

In 2017, Resida played for Suwaiq Club in Oman.

Personal life
Born in the Netherlands, Resida is of Surinamese descent.

References

External links
 
 Voetbal International profile 

Living people
1989 births
Association football midfielders
Dutch footballers
Dutch sportspeople of Surinamese descent
Footballers from Amsterdam
SC Telstar players
FC Emmen players
VVV-Venlo players
RKC Waalwijk players
Eerste Divisie players